Dewey County is a county in the U.S. state of South Dakota. As of the 2020 census, the population was 5,239. Its county seat is Timber Lake. The county was created in 1883 and organized in 1910. It was named for William P. Dewey, Territorial surveyor-general from 1873 to 1877.

Almost the entire county lies in the Cheyenne River Indian Reservation. The balance of the county, along its extreme northern county line, lies in the Standing Rock Indian Reservation. It is one of five South Dakota counties that are contained within Indian reservations.

Geography
The Moreau River flows east-northeasterly through the upper central parts of Dewey County, discharging into the Missouri River near the county's NE corner. Smaller drainages move runoff water northward from the central-eastern portions to the Missouri River, discharging near the community of Promise. A significant arm of the Missouri River forms the county's southeastern border. The county terrain consists of rolling hills, sloping southeastward and dropping off into the Missouri River basin.

The eastern portion of South Dakota's counties (48 of 66) observe Central Time; the western counties (18 of 66) observe Mountain Time. Dewey County is the easternmost of the SD counties to observe Mountain Time.

Major highways

 U.S. Highway 212
 South Dakota Highway 20
 South Dakota Highway 63
 South Dakota Highway 65

Adjacent counties

 Corson County – north
 Walworth County – northeast (observes Central Time)
 Potter County – east (observes Central Time)
 Sully County – southeast (observes Central Time)
 Stanley County – south
 Ziebach County – west

Protected Areas
 Firesteel Dam State Game Production Area
 Isabel Lake State Game Production Area
 Little Moreau State Game Production Area
 Little Moreau State Recreation Area

Lakes
 Lake Isabel
 Lake Oahe (partial)
 Little Moreau Lake

Demographics

2000 census
As of the 2000 United States Census, there were 5,972 people, 1,863 households, and 1,386 families in the county. The population density was 3 people per square mile (1/km2). There were 2,133 housing units at an average density of 0.9 per square mile (0.4/km2). The racial makeup of the county was 74.16% Native American, 24.15% White, 0.03% Black or African American, 0.12% Asian, 0.05% Pacific Islander, 0.07% from other races, and 1.42% from two or more races. 0.85% of the population were Hispanic or Latino of any race. 14.2% were of German ancestry. 84.6% spoke English and 14.4% Dakota as their first language.

There were 1,863 households, out of which 43.70% had children under the age of 18 living with them, 42.90% were married couples living together, 22.30% had a female householder with no husband present, and 25.60% were non-families. 22.10% of all households were made up of individuals, and 8.90% had someone living alone who was 65 years of age or older. The average household size was 3.15 and the average family size was 3.66.

The county population contained 38.90% under the age of 18, 9.00% from 18 to 24, 27.20% from 25 to 44, 16.60% from 45 to 64, and 8.30% who were 65 years of age or older. The median age was 26 years. For every 100 females there were 95.90 males. For every 100 females age 18 and over, there were 95.00 males.

The median income for a household in the county was $23,272, and the median income for a family was $24,917. Males had a median income of $21,522 versus $18,777 for females. The per capita income for the county was $9,251. About 29.80% of families and 33.60% of the population were below the poverty line, including 37.70% of those under age 18 and 28.50% of those age 65 or over. The county's per-capita income makes it one of the poorest counties in the United States.

2010 census
As of the 2010 United States Census, there were 5,301 people, 1,730 households, and 1,239 families in the county. The racial makeup of the county was 74.9% American Indian, 21.0% white, 0.2% Asian, 0.1% black or African American, 0.2% from other races, and 3.6% from two or more races. Those of Hispanic or Latino origin made up 1.8% of the population. In terms of ancestry, 13.2% were German, 6.5% were Irish, and 0.6% were American.

Of the 1,730 households, 45.9% had children under the age of 18 living with them, 37.6% were married couples living together, 24.2% had a female householder with no husband present, 28.4% were non-families, and 24.6% of all households were made up of individuals. The average household size was 3.05 and the average family size was 3.60. The median age was 30.0 years.

The median income for a household in the county was $33,255 and the median income for a family was $40,500. Males had a median income of $33,942 versus $28,594 for females. The per capita income for the county was $15,632. About 20.5% of families and 30.5% of the population were below the poverty line, including 39.5% of those under age 18 and 13.5% of those age 65 or over.

Communities

Cities
 Eagle Butte (partial)
 Timber Lake (county seat)

Town
 Isabel

Census-designated places

 Green Grass 
 La Plant 
 Lantry
 North Eagle Butte 
 Swift Bird
 Whitehorse

Unincorporated communities

 Bear Creek
 Firesteel
 Glencross 
 Parade
 Promise
 Ridgeview

Unorganized territories
The county is divided into two areas of unorganized territory: North Dewey and South Dewey.

Politics
Dewey has since the 1990s been a strongly Democratic county in solidly Republican South Dakota. The last Republican to carry the county was Ronald Reagan in his 1984 landslide when he came within 3,819 votes of claiming all fifty states. Before this period, by contrast, Dewey was a Republican-leaning county even for South Dakota. Between its formation and 1984, Dewey had voted Democratic only in the three landslide Democratic wins of 1964, 1936 and 1932, plus for Woodrow Wilson in 1916 when his anti-war policies had strong appeal in the West.

See also
 National Register of Historic Places listings in Dewey County, South Dakota

References

 
1910 establishments in South Dakota
Populated places established in 1910